"Tim McGraw" is the debut single by American singer-songwriter Taylor Swift, who wrote it with Liz Rose for her self-titled debut album. It was released to US country radio on June 19, 2006, by Big Machine Records. Produced by Nathan Chapman, the track combines elements of country music with the '50s progression; music critics noted influences of non-country genres such as alternative rock on the composition. Written by Swift when she was in her freshman year of high school, the lyrics narrate a summer romance that comes to a sudden end. In the storyline, the narrator pleads with her ex-boyfriend to reminisce about her every time he hears her favorite song by country musician Tim McGraw, the song's namesake.

The single was Swift's first chart entry on the US Billboard Hot 100, peaking at number 40. On the Hot Country Songs chart, it peaked at number six. The Recording Industry Association of America certified the track double platinum for surpassing two million units based on sales and streaming. The accompanying music video for "Tim McGraw", directed by Trey Fanjoy, comprises flashbacks by Swift's love interest, among cut scenes that feature Swift lying on a lake bed. Swift performed "Tim McGraw" as opening act to other country musicians in 2006 and 2007, and included it on the set lists of her first headlining tour, the Fearless Tour (2009–2010), and the Eras Tour (2023).

Background

Taylor Swift and Liz Rose wrote "Tim McGraw" during Swift's freshman year at Hendersonville High School. She conceived the idea in the midst of her mathematics class: "I was just sitting there, and I started humming this melody." She then related the melody to a predicament she was encountering at the moment. Swift knew that she and her senior boyfriend would break up at the end of the year when he left for college. In order to cope with the complicated emotions she was experiencing, Swift wrote the song. Rose said Swift showed up at her after school job, writing songs for Sony/ATV Music, "with the idea and the melody, knowing exactly what she wanted." She desired for the song to capture the sweetness and sadness of loving and losing someone. It was written about all the different things that would remind the subject of Swift and their time spent together, once he departed. "To her surprise, the first thing that came to mind was [her] love of Tim McGraw's music." Several personal details were listed for the song. McGraw's mentioning was a reference to Swift's favorite song, "Can't Tell Me Nothin" from his 2004 album Live Like You Were Dying, rather than McGraw as a person. The writing process, as with "Our Song", took place in approximately twenty minutes, and was executed with the use of a piano.

Soon after, Scott Borchetta, CEO of Big Machine Records, signed Swift to his newly formed label. Early into the album production, in a meeting where Borchetta and Swift discussed potential songs for Swift's debut album, she performed "Tim McGraw" for Borchetta on fluke ukulele. According to Swift, as soon as Borchetta finished listening to the song, he faced Swift and said, "That's your first single." She responded, "Well. That's how that works then." Prior to that event, Swift did not believe that the song was single material. However, she followed what label executives told her and accepted that they were correct. Swift placed "Tim McGraw" as the first track on Taylor Swift because of its importance to her. In retrospect, Swift has said that the song "is reminiscent, and it is thinking about a relationship you had and then lost. I think one of the most powerful human emotions is what should have been and wasn't... That was a really good song to start out on, because a lot of people can relate to wanting something you can't have." When the song's subject discovered it, he thought it was "cool" and kept friendship with Swift despite their breakup.

Composition

"Tim McGraw" is a country song with a length of three minutes and 52 seconds. The song mingles traditional and modern country features, primarily through its usage of a twelve-string guitar. Driven by an acoustic guitar, it is categorized as a ballad with a mid-paced tempo. Written in the key of C major, the song makes heavy use of the I-vi-IV-V chord progression (C major—A minor—F major—G major). As the I-vi-IV-V chord progression is associated with late-1950s and early-1960s doo-wop and rock and roll songs, "Tim McGraw" has a nostalgic and timeless feel to it.

The production of "Tim McGraw" is understated and lightweight. The refrain, as described by musicologist James E. Perone, is "motivically based"—each one of the melodic motif is built within a small pitch range. According to Perone, this, as well as that the refrain is built on repetitions of the initial short motif, gives the song a catchy tune that makes the audience want to sing along to. Additionally, the refrain—and to a certain extent, the verses—makes heavy use of syncopation at the sixteenth-note level, which lends the song a production reminiscent to non-country genres, such as alternative rock and hip hop. These melodic techniques laid the groundwork to Swift's subsequent songs, known for catchy melodies and radio-friendly verses that defined her catalog for the following decade.

The lyrics of "Tim McGraw" narrate a past summer romance. Perone thinks that the relationship in the song "had ended perhaps a couple of years" before the time frame of the narrative. In the opening line, Swift sings, "He says the way my blue eyes shine put those Georgia stars to shame at night/ I say, 'That's a lie' ", which Riane Konc found to be "genuine romanticism underscored by real cynicism". The reference to country musician Tim McGraw, in both the title and the refrain ("When you think Tim McGraw/ I hope you think my favorite song/ The one we danced to all night long"), is more about the nostalgia for the disappeared romance rather than McGraw himself. McGraw is one of the many items that the narrator associates her past relationship with; others include her little black dress, her faded blue jeans, and the moment she laid her head on the ex-boyfriend's chest.

Critical reception

The song was acclaimed by critics. Rob Sheffield of Blender magazine described the track as a gem that hit hard. Sean Dooley of About.com complimented Swift's vocal delivery, describing it as "tender and emotive."
 Jonathan Keefe of Slant Magazine believe "Tim McGraw" followed "time-tested narrative conventions and [...] massive pop hooks." Jeff Tamarkin of AllMusic said that the song demonstrated Swift was "a talent to be reckoned with", because of her vocal delivery that, according to him, equated that of a seasoned professional. He selected "Tim McGraw" as Taylor Swifts main highlight for its homage to Tim McGraw, commenting, "It's a device that's been used countless times in as many ways [...], yet it works as a hook here and manages to come off as an original idea." Rick Bell of Country Standard Time stated, "It's an impressive debut that, while she pines about lost love and Tim McGraw, will likely have others singing the praises of Taylor Swift." Roger Holland of PopMatters praised the song, commenting it was "good enough to recall some of the best country singles of recent years", such as Rachel Proctor's "Me and Emily" and Julie Roberts's "Break Down Here." He complimented Swift's vocal abilities on the song, saying it was executed "quite perfectly", something she was unable to carry throughout the album Taylor Swift. However, Holland was repugnant of the song's title. In 2007, "Tim McGraw" was listed as a "Winning Song" by Broadcast Music Incorporated (BMI).

In 2020, Rolling Stone ranked "Tim McGraw" at number 11 on its "The 100 Greatest Debut Singles of All Time" list, placing second among female artists; the magazine stated: "With her first song, Swift immediately showed her Nashville peers she could beat any of them at their own game, acing the classic genre trope of nostalgic country song about how country music is nostalgic".

Chart performance
On the week ending September 23, 2006, "Tim McGraw" debuted at number 86 on the Billboard Hot 100. After 17 weeks of ascending and descending the chart, on the week ending January 13, 2007, the song reached its peak at number 40 on the Billboard Hot 100, where it stayed for two consecutive weeks. On the week ending February 3, 2007, the song spent its last week on the Billboard Hot 100 at number 43, after a total of 20 weeks on the chart. As of November 2017, "Tim McGraw" has sold 1.6 million copies in the United States. The single was certified double Platinum by the Recording Industry Association of America (RIAA) in March 2020, for surpassing two million units based on sales and streaming.

Prior to charting on the United States' main chart, "Tim McGraw" charted on Billboard Hot Country Songs. On the week ending July 1, 2006, "Tim McGraw" debuted at number 60 on the Billboard Hot Country Songs. After spending 25 weeks upon Billboard Hot Country Songs, the song reached the top 10 with its new peak of number 10 on the week ending December 16, 2006. In the proceeding six weeks, the song managed remained on the top 10 until finding its peak at number six on the week ending January 27, 2007. "Tim McGraw" spent a total of 35 weeks upon the Billboard Hot Country Songs chart.

Music video
The accompanying music video for "Tim McGraw" was directed by Trey Fanjoy. It was filmed at the former home of Johnny & June Carter-Cash, which burned down the next year. The letter which the boyfriend receives is addressed to "Johnny" for this purpose. In regards to the video's concept, Swift stated, "It deals with the haunting power of music and how hearing a song years after it was first popular can have such an emotional appeal." Clayton Collins portrayed Swift's love interest in the music video. He was cast because of his physical resemblance to the real subject of the song, in that they were both tall with dark hair.

The video begins with Swift, dressed in a white sundress, as she lies on the grass of a lake-bed and holds a transistor radio. Suddenly, the setting is switched to Collins as he drives a white and orange 1970 Chevrolet CST-10. He then turns his radio on and ceases driving, coming to a complete stop on a road. As Collins facial expressions become more serious, he flashbacks to memories with Swift. Swift and Collins are seen frolicking in a field, lying beside another on the back of Collins' CST-10, staring at the stars together, holding hands as they walk, and slow dancing. When the song is in its final chorus, Collins arrives at a wooden cabin in his pick-up truck. He runs up the staircase to discover an enveloped letter next to the door. He then sits on the staircase, opens the envelope, and reads the letter. The video transcends towards Swift playing an acoustic guitar as she leans against the wooden cabin. Cut-scenes feature Swift lying on the lake-bed and performing with a guitar next to the wooden cabin. The video concludes with Swift, once again, lying on the initial setting.

The video premiered on July 22, 2006, on Great American Country. The video received a nomination for "Number One Streamed Video From a New Artist (Rookie of the Year Award)" at the web-hosted 2006 CMT Online Awards, but lost to Lindsey Haun's video for "Broken". At the 2007 CMT Music Awards, the video won the CMT Music Award for "Breakthrough Video of the Year".

Accolades

Live performances

Swift spent six months of 2006 promoting "Tim McGraw" and Taylor Swift on a radio tour.  She performed the song as she opened for Rascal Flatts on several dates, from October 19 to November 3, 2006, included on the Me and My Gang Tour (2006–07). Swift performed "Tim McGraw" as the concert's penultimate performance. She dressed in a black, knee-length dress and red cowboy boots with a design of a skull and cross bones across it, playing an acoustic guitar. Swift requested for the audience to raise their cell phones in order to simulate a sky filled with stars, when the song reached the lyrics "He said the way my blue eyes shined / Put those Georgia stars to shame that night / I said that's a lie." She also performed the song when she served as opening act on twenty dates for George Strait's 2007 United States tour, and selected dates for Brad Paisley's Bonfires & Amplifiers Tour in 2007. During mid-2007, Swift engaged as the opening act on several dates for Tim McGraw's and Faith Hill's joint tour, Soul2Soul II Tour (2006–07), where she again performed "Tim McGraw". Swift performed the song while she was again opening for Rascal Flatts for their Still Feels Good Tour in 2008.

Swift's first broadcast performance of "Tim McGraw" was on October 24, 2006, on Good Morning America. She continued promotion for the track at Billboard headquarters, the 2007 Academy of Country Music Awards, The Engine Room, and a concert at the Apple Store in SoHo, New York, which was recorded and released as a live extended play (EP), iTunes Live from SoHo, exclusively sold through the iTunes Store. Since completing promotion for Taylor Swift and its corresponding singles, Swift has performed "Tim McGraw" at the 2009 CMA Music Festival, the 2009 V Festival, and the Australian charity concert Sydney Sound Relief.

Swift performed "Tim McGraw" on all venues of her first headlining concert tour, the Fearless Tour, which extended from April 2009 to June 2010. The performances of "Tim McGraw" set on a small platform located at the opposite end, parallel to the stage in the arena. Swift, dressed in a pastel sundress, sat on a wooden stool while performing with wooden acoustic guitar strapped to her shoulder. Swift then completed the performance standing and walking back to the main stage. As she worked her way back to the stage, she again hugged fans, squeezed their outstretched hands and scrawled quick autographs. Nicole Frehsee of Rolling Stone favored Swift's performance of "Tim McGraw" at the August 27, 2009, concert at Madison Square Garden in New York City. Frehsee described the entire concert as an "elaborate spectacle that doesn't slow down, even when the singer hauls her acoustic guitar into the audience to play a sweet, stripped down set of tunes including [..] 'Tim McGraw'." Brandy McDonnel of The Oklahoman reported a massive sing-along by the audience at the March 31, 2010, concert at the Ford Center in Oklahoma City. Molly Trust of Billboard attended the performance at the tour's final concert on June 5, 2010, at Gillette Stadium in Foxborough, Massachusetts and conjectured that the performance's setting was formed in order to "afford a better view to fans farther back."

Swift performed "Tim McGraw" during the first show in Toronto and the performance in Charlotte during The Red Tour, in place of "I Almost Do". Additionally, she performed a piano version of the song in Nashville, during the Reputation Stadium Tour, with special guests Faith Hill and Tim McGraw. The song was performed on the Eras Tour (2023).

Track listing
Promotional CD
 "Tim McGraw" (Album cut) – 3:52
 "Tim McGraw" (Radio edit) – 3:39
 "Tim McGraw" (Album cut) – 3:52

7-inch vinyl
 "Tim McGraw" – 3:52
 "Tim McGraw" (Live acoustic 2006) – 4:00

Charts

Weekly charts

Year-end chart

Certification

Release history

References

Source

2000s ballads
2006 songs
2006 debut singles
Taylor Swift songs
Big Machine Records singles
Songs written by Liz Rose
Songs written by Taylor Swift
Song recordings produced by Nathan Chapman (record producer)
Music videos directed by Trey Fanjoy
Country ballads
Cultural depictions of country musicians
Songs about heartache
Songs about nostalgia